Events in 2014 in Japanese television.

Debuts

Ongoing
Music Fair, music (1964–present)
Mito Kōmon, jidaigeki (1969-2011)
Sazae-san, anime (1969–present)
FNS Music Festival, music (1974–present)
Panel Quiz Attack 25, game show (1975–present)
Soreike! Anpanman. anime (1988–present)
Downtown no Gaki no Tsukai ya Arahende!!, game show (1989–present)
Crayon Shin-chan, anime (1992–present)
Nintama Rantarō, anime (1993–present)
Chibi Maruko-chan, anime (1995–present)
Detective Conan, anime (1996–present)
SASUKE, sports (1997–present)
Ojarumaru, anime (1998–present)
One Piece, anime (1999–present)
Doraemon, anime (2005–present)
Naruto Shippuden, anime (2007–2017)
Pocket Monsters XY, anime (2013–2016)

Returning Series
Dragon Ball Kai, anime (2014-2015)
Fairy Tail, anime (2014-2016, 2018-2019)

New Series
Sailor Moon Crystal, ONA (2014-2015)

Ended
Saint Seiya Omega, anime (2012-2014)
Toriko, anime (2011-2014)
Hunter x Hunter, anime (2011-2014)
Domoto Kyodai, music (2000-2014)
Yu-Gi-Oh! ZEXAL II, anime (2012-2014)
Zyuden Sentai Kyoryuger, tokusatsu (2013-2014)
Waratte Iitomo,  variety (1982-2014)

Deaths

See also
 2014 in anime
 2014 Japanese television dramas
 2014 in Japan
 2014 in Japanese music
 List of Japanese films of 2014

References